Christos Myriounis  (born June 15, 1971 in Athens) is a retired Greek professional basketball player. At a height of 2.05 m (6'8 "), he played as a small forward-power forward.

Professional career
Myriounis started his playing career with Kronos BCE. In 1991, he was selected along with Fragiskos Alvertis and Nikos Oikonomou, to join the Greek Basket League club Panathinaikos. In 1993, Myriounis was a starter with Panathinaikos (his teammates were great players such as Nikos Galis, Arijan Komazec, Stojko Vranković, and Tiit Sokk), and with them, he won the Greek Cup title. In 1994 and 1995, with Panathinaikos, he finished in 3rd place in the EuroLeague Final Four. He also won the EuroLeague championship of 1996, while with Panathinaikos.

During the next season after that, he played for Apollon Patras, and he was a Greek Cup finalist with them. He also played for Peristeri, Irakleio, and Aris.

National team career
Myriounis also played with the senior Greek national basketball team at the EuroBasket 1997.

References

External links 
FIBA Archive Profile
FIBA Europe Profile
Hellenic Federation Profile 
Eurobasket.com Profile

1971 births
Living people
Apollon Patras B.C. players
Aris B.C. players
Greek men's basketball players
Greek Basket League players
Irakleio B.C. players
Panathinaikos B.C. players
Power forwards (basketball)
Small forwards
Basketball players from Athens